The 2002 Boston Marathon was the 106th running of the annual marathon race in Boston, United States and was held on April 15, 2002. The elite men's race was won by Kenya's Rodgers Rop in a time of 2:09:02 hours and the women's race was won by another Kenyan Margaret Okayo in 2:20:43.

A total of 14,400 people finished the race, 9149 men and 5251 women.

Results

Men

Women

References

Results. Association of Road Racing Statisticians. Retrieved 2020-04-13.

External links
 Boston Athletic Association website

Boston Marathon
Boston
Boston Marathon
Marathon
Boston Marathon